The Lucas Mansion, also known as the Hiddenite Center, is a historic home located at Hiddenite, Alexander County, North Carolina. It was built about 1900, and is a three-story, frame Queen Anne style dwelling.  It features a two-story wraparound porch. It was enlarged to its present size by 1928. Local tradition says the house was enlarged twice by raising the existing floor and building a new floor beneath or between the existing floors. The house roughly follows a cruciform plan, though the plan varies from floor to floor. It was owned by James Paul Lucas, a South Carolina native and international diamond merchant.

It was listed on the National Register of Historic Places in 1982.

In 1981, Eileen Sharpe and R.Y Sharpe purchased the mansion and established the Hiddenite Center. The Hiddenite Center has restored the first floor of the Lucas Mansion with period furnishings and a collection of local gemstones and minerals.  The second floor is used as a regional art gallery and includes a gift shop.  The third floor features a large collection of dolls on display.

References

External links

Hiddenite Center website

Houses on the National Register of Historic Places in North Carolina
Queen Anne architecture in North Carolina
Houses completed in 1900
Houses in Alexander County, North Carolina
National Register of Historic Places in Alexander County, North Carolina
Museums in Alexander County, North Carolina